Norman Standish Brooks (11 March 1910 – 23 September 1953) was an English competition swimmer who represented Great Britain in the Olympics and England in the British Empire Games during the late 1920s and early 1930s.  He competed in freestyle swimming events.

At the 1928 Summer Olympics in Amsterdam, Netherlands, he competed in the qualifying heats of the men's 100-metre freestyle.  His time was the 17th best overall; he did not advance to the semi-finals.  Two years later he won the silver medal in 100-yards freestyle competition at the inaugural 1930 British Empire Games in Hamilton, Ontario.  He won a second silver medal as a member of the English men's team in the 4×200-yard freestyle relay.

Brooks was born in Ashton-under-Lyne, Greater Manchester, England, and died in Oldham, Greater Manchester, England.  He was 43 years old.

See also
 List of Commonwealth Games medallists in swimming (men)

External links
Norman Brooks – Olympic athlete profile at Sports Reference.com

1910 births
1953 deaths
Commonwealth Games silver medallists for England
English male freestyle swimmers
Olympic swimmers of Great Britain
Swimmers at the 1928 Summer Olympics
Swimmers at the 1930 British Empire Games
Commonwealth Games medallists in swimming
Sportspeople from Ashton-under-Lyne
Medallists at the 1930 British Empire Games